Olivier Zarrouati (born April 16, 1958 in Toulon, France) is a French engineer and business man. From 2007 until 2017, he served as Chief Executive Officer of Zodiac Aerospace.

Biography

Education 
Zarrouati, an alumnus of the Ecole Polytechnique (1980), graduated from the École nationale supérieure de l'aéronautique et de l'espace in 1982.

Career 
Zarrouati started his career as a defense engineer before joining the French Space agency (Centre National d’Etudes Spatiales) from 1982 to 1988. In 1989, he joined Matra Marconi Space as project manager for earth observation satellites. In 1998, he led the Development Direction of Intertechnique which was acquired by Zodiac group in 1999. He then served as CEO of Aerosafety’s segment and CEO of the Group’s aeronautical activities. Since 2007, he has been Chief Executive Officer of Zodiac Aerospace. In October 2015, he was chosen by the Supervisory Board to serve a third term of four years as CEO.

Other activity 
Since 2011, Zarrouati has been President of the ISAE SUPAERO Foundation.

Honors 
In 2000, he was appointed Knight of the National Order of Merit and Knight of the Legion of Honor in 2013.

References 

1958 births
Living people
Businesspeople from Toulon
French engineers
French chief executives